"Sunday Bloody Sunday" is a song by U2.

Sunday Bloody Sunday may also refer to:
 Sunday Bloody Sunday (film), a 1971 British drama film by John Schlesinger
 "Sunday Bloody Sunday" (John Lennon and Yoko Ono song) (1972)
  "Sunday, Bloody Sunday", an episode of That '70s Show

See also
 Bloody Sunday (disambiguation)